Carl Filtsch (28 May 1830 – 11 May 1845) was a Transylvanian pianist and composer. He was a child prodigy, and student of Frédéric Chopin.

Life and education
Filtsch was born in Mühlbach (Sebeș) in present-day Romania. His father, a Lutheran church pastor in Mühlbach, was his first piano teacher. His first public success came at the Gesellschaft der Musikfreunde in Vienna. Carl and his brother Joseph, also a child pianist, arrived in Paris on November 29, 1841, and immediately sought out Chopin to be Carl's teacher.  Though Chopin almost never taught children, and rarely gave a student more than one lesson per week, he agreed to teach Carl, and gave him three lessons per week.

Considered Chopin's most talented pupil, Filtsch received high praise from Franz Liszt, Friedrich Wieck, Giacomo Meyerbeer, Ignaz Moscheles, the music critic Ludwig Rellstab, and fellow child prodigy, Anton Rubinstein.  Filtsch began touring Europe on concert tours at the age of 13.  After triumphant concerts in Paris, London, and Vienna, his promising career was cut short by an early death in Venice from tuberculosis.

Quality of playing
According to numerous letters from Chopin and his acquaintances, Chopin considered Filtsch the most worthy interpreter of his music.  A friend of Chopin, Ferdinand Denis, reported in an article in Vienna's Der Humorist in February 1843 that on one occasion after listening to Filtsch, Chopin exclaimed, "My God!  What a child!  Nobody has ever understood me as this child has...It is not imitation, it is the same sentiment, an instinct that makes him play without thinking as if it could not have been any other way.  He plays almost all my compositions without having heard me [play them], without being shown the smallest thing - not exactly like me [because he has his own cachet], but certainly not less well."

Recordings
 Filtsch, Talberg, Liszt, Chopin: Piano music - Leonhard Westermayr (CD MMS 2616)
 (2010) Mikuli, Teffelsen, Filtsch, Gutmann: Piano music - Hubert Rutkowski (Naxos 8.572344)
 (2011) Mikuli, Teffelsen, Filtsch: Violin & piano music - Voytek Proniewicz, Alexander Jakobidze-Gitman (Naxos 8.572460)
 (2012) Tellefsen and Filtsch: Piano Concerto, Concert Piece, Overture - Hubert Rutkowski, Polish Radio Symphony Orchestra, Lukasz Borowicz (Accord 177 2)
(2016)   Carl Filtsch Piano Solo Pieces - Chiyo Hagiwara  (ALCD-9161)

References

External links
 The Annual Filtsch Piano Competition
 Konzertstueck by Carl Filtsch (1830-1845)
 Partial list of works

Polish Romantic composers
Austrian classical composers
Austrian children
Transylvanian Saxon people
1830 births
1845 deaths
Austrian classical pianists
Male classical pianists
Child classical musicians
Pupils of Frédéric Chopin
People from Sebeș
19th-century deaths from tuberculosis
19th-century classical composers
19th-century classical pianists
19th-century male musicians
Tuberculosis deaths in Italy
Infectious disease deaths in Veneto